The "Himno de Riego" ("Anthem of Riego") is a song dating from the Trienio Liberal (1820–1823) of Spain and named in honour of Colonel Rafael del Riego, a figure in the respective uprising, which restored the liberal constitution of 1812. The lyrics were written by Evaristo Fernández de San Miguel, while the music is typically attributed to José Melchor Gomis.

It was declared the national anthem of Spain in 1822, remaining so until the overthrow of the liberal government the next year in 1823, and was also one of the popular anthems used in the First Spanish Republic (1873–1874) and, with much more prominence, the Second Spanish Republic (1931–1939). It continued to be used by the Second Republican government in exile until it was dissolved in 1977 upon the end of the Francoist Spanish State in 1975.

History 
The "Himno de Riego" was written between 31 January and 6 February 1820 in the town of Algeciras by Evaristo Fernández de San Miguel, lieutenant colonel of the flying column headed by Rafael del Riego, who had previously rejected another text by Antonio Alcalá Galiano.

It was declared the official national anthem of Spain on 7 April 1822 when the Cortes Generales approved the corresponding decree, which was signed by King Fernando VII in Aranjuez two days later and finally published in the Madrid Gazette on 14 April. However, the liberal government was overthrown and the constitution repealed by Fernando VII in October 1823, with the "Marcha Real" resuming its role as the national anthem.

In the First Republic of 1873 to 1874, part of the greater 1868–1874 Sexenio Democrático achieved by the overthrow of Isabella II in the Glorious Revolution, the anthem occupied a discreet position; the most popular anthems used at this time were "La Marseillaise" and the "Himno de Garibaldi". However, by the time of the Second Republic of 1931 to 1939, the anthem had once again gained popularity to the point of becoming the primary institutional representative of the government during this period.

Contrary to popular belief, the "Himno de Riego" was never declared the official anthem of the First or Second Republic. According to one opinion, it can be deduced that the republicans did not consider the 1822 declaration of the song as the national anthem superseded or repealed.

Lyrics

Original lyrics (1820–1823) 
The following is the original version used during the Trienio Liberal (1820–1823).

First short version (1931–1939) 
The following is the version used during the Second Spanish Republic (1931–1939). It consisted of verses one, three and seven of the original version, with a few minor lyrical changes.

Second short version 
The following version consists of the first and last verses of the original, with a few minor lyrical changes.

Incidents involving the incorrect use of the anthem

1952 Cusco Cathedral bell dedication ceremony 
Che Guevara claims that, when the famous bell of the Cusco Cathedral in Peru was rededicated at the expense of the Francoist Spanish government after a 1950 earthquake, the bell was made to play the Spanish national anthem, which then erroneously played the Himno de Riego, to the consternation of attending Spanish officials.

1968 European championship controversy 
On October 1, 1967, during the qualifying stage for the European championship in Prague, the "Himno de Riego" was performed by mistake instead of the then official anthem of Spain "Marcha Real".

2003 Davis Cup controversy 
At the 2003 Davis Cup finals held in Australia, James Morrison performed "Himno de Riego" instead of Spain's current national anthem, the "Marcha Real" (Royal March). Australian tennis officials claimed there was an error on the CD provided to the musician, but Spanish sport authorities still issued an official protest.

Notes 

 1.Used by the Government in Exile until its dissolution in 1977.

References

External links

Spanish anthems
Historical national anthems
National symbols of Spain
Political party songs
Himno
Spanish-language songs